The Bannockburn Football and Netball Club is an Australian rules football and netball club based in the rural town of Bannockburn, 21 km north of Geelong, Victoria.

The club teams currently compete in the Geelong DFL since 1970.

History
At the end of the WWI, the club was competing in the Leigh Cup competition until it disbanded in 1923. The club moved to the Mathison Cup in 1924, and then later the Elliott Cup. In 1953 the club moved to the Geelong & District Football league. Player shortage in 1956 forced a merger with neighbouring club Lethbridge, the merger lasted 3 years before Lethbridge went it alone before they too went into recess in 1962.

In 1970 the club reformed after having hiatus since the end of 1958. They were accepted into Woolworth Cup (2nd division) competition of the GDFL. The club had the occasional success in the 1970s as they were a middle-of-the-road club that would make the finals only to lose at the end of the season. Relegated to 2nd Division in 1984, the club lost the 1984 Grand final by 41 points.  In 1985 they were minor premiers, only to crash out by losing both finals.  In 1990 they won the Premiership by defeating Thomson by 52 points.

Promoted into 1st division the club went back to back in 1997 and 1998. A further premiership was won in 2003.

In 2019, as massive underdogs, they upset Thomson to win their first premiership in 16 years by 6 points.

Premierships 
 Mathieson Cup
 1925, 1931
 Geelong & District Football League
1990, 1997, 1998, 2003, 2019

VFL/AFL

Peter Riccardi -  
Leigh Harding - 
Alan Woodman - 
James Worpel -

Bibliography
 Cat Country: History of Football In The Geelong Region by John Stoward –

References

External links
 Twitter site
 Instagrram site
 Teamapp site

Geelong & District Football League clubs
Sports clubs established in 1970
Australian rules football clubs established in 1970
1970 establishments in Australia
Netball teams in Victoria (Australia)